Alessandro "Sandro" Nannini (born 7 July 1959) is a former racing driver from Italy. He is the younger brother of singer Gianna Nannini. His five-year F1 career resulted in his one and only  win at the 1989 Japanese Grand Prix but ended less than a year later after a helicopter crash severed his right forearm.

Biography
Nannini was born in Siena. He began racing in a Lancia Stratos at national rally events before switching to Formula Italia in 1981. From 1982 to 1984, he raced for Minardi in Formula 2, attracting some attention for his speed in the uncompetitive car. Though his best season saw him only seventh overall in 1983, he was signed by Lancia to drive their fast but fragile LC2 prototype in the World Sportscar Championship, setting fastest lap at the 1984 24 Hours of Le Mans where he finished eighth with Bob Wollek, and later that year winning the 1984 1000 km of Kyalami with Riccardo Patrese. For 1985, Giancarlo Minardi wanted Nannini to drive his new Formula One car, but Nannini was controversially denied an FIA Super Licence with his former F2 teammate Pierluigi Martini taking the drive instead. Nannini continued with Lancia instead, his best result being third in the 1000km Monza.

For 1986, Nannini was finally granted a Super Licence and signed up with Minardi's Grand Prix team, where he stayed until 1987. The car was uncompetitive and unreliable (Nannini was classified only four times from 30 starts with the team), largely due to its disappointing Motori Moderni V6 engine. However, Nannini's speed was noticed by many, especially after he largely outperformed experienced teammate Andrea de Cesaris in 1986. The following year, in his spare time, Nannini paired with veteran road race driver Giorgio Marin to win the 1987 Mille Miglia.  

Benetton signed Nannini for 1988 to drive alongside Thierry Boutsen. He generally performed very well, often out-pacing the highly regarded Belgian if not matching his consistency. He scored his first point in his second race for the team and took two third places on his way to tenth overall in the championship.

With Boutsen leaving for Williams Nannini was promoted to team leader at Benetton alongside young Englishman Johnny Herbert and delivered a number of strong performances, especially at Suzuka. There he lay third behind the two McLaren cars of Ayrton Senna and Alain Prost when they collided, giving Nannini the lead. Prost retired whereas Senna rejoined after being push-started and pitted to replace his front wing, trailing Nannini in the race. Nannini was eventually passed by Senna who went on to cross the finish line first, however, the Brazilian was subsequently disqualified for missing the chicane following his collision with Prost. The disqualification handed Nannini what proved to be his only Formula One win. He rounded off the season with an impressive second place in torrential rain at Adelaide, moving him to sixth overall in the championship.

For 1990, he was joined in the team by Nelson Piquet and reverted to being the number two driver. However, he impressed by largely matching the pace of the three-times World Champion. At Hockenheim he led the race by deciding against stopping for tyres, resisting Senna for 16 laps before fading grip dropped him to second. He also challenged at the following Hungarian Grand Prix, hounding leader Boutsen until being controversially pushed off by the following Senna.

On 12 October 1990, the week after the 1990 Spanish Grand Prix, where he had finished third, Nannini was involved in a helicopter crash over his Siena vineyard, suffering a severed right forearm. The injury healed thanks to microsurgery but it ended his Formula One career. Nannini had been reconfirmed by Benetton for 1991 but Ferrari had a long-standing interest in the driver and were considering him as a replacement for the departing Nigel Mansell.

Once sufficiently recovered, Ferrari offered Nannini a test drive on its private Fiorano Circuit in 1992. Nannini completed a total of 38 laps driving Jean Alesi's Ferrari F92A, which featured a specially modified steering wheel. In 1996, Benetton's Flavio Briatore also honoured the promise of a test drive, which took place at Estoril aboard a B196.

Despite only regaining partial use of his right hand, Nannini was able to carve out a career in touring car racing with Alfa Romeo in the 1990s, placing fourth overall in the 1994 DTM championship and third in the 1996 International Touring Car Championship.

Nannini competed for Mercedes in the 1997 FIA GT Championship, finishing sixth overall and winning a race at Suzuka, before hanging up his helmet. He now runs a chain of upmarket cafes bearing his name, with branches as far flung as Indonesia.

2007 saw Nannini's return to the track after a decade in retirement. He agreed to take part in the short-lived Grand Prix Masters championship for Formula One veterans, alongside drivers including his former Benetton teammate Johnny Herbert.

He is a member of the Italy–USA Foundation.

Matteo Nannini, a son of a first cousin of Alessandro, is also a racing driver, who last raced at Formula 3 level during 2021.

Racing record

Career summary

Complete European Formula Two Championship results
(key) (Races in bold indicate pole position; races in italics indicate fastest lap)

24 Hours of Le Mans results

Complete Formula One results
(key) (Races in italics indicate fastest lap)

Complete Deutsche Tourenwagen Meisterschaft results
(key) (Races in bold indicate pole position; races in italics indicate fastest lap)

† — Retired, but was classified as he completed 90% of the winner's race distance.

Complete International Touring Car Championship results
(key) (Races in bold indicate pole position; races in italics indicate fastest lap)

References

External links

Alessandro Nannini's full biography at 8W
Caffe Nannini official website

1959 births
Living people
Sportspeople from Siena
Italian racing drivers
Italian Formula One drivers
Benetton Formula One drivers
Minardi Formula One drivers
Formula One race winners
European Formula Two Championship drivers
Italian amputees
Grand Prix Masters drivers
Deutsche Tourenwagen Masters drivers
24 Hours of Le Mans drivers
World Touring Car Championship drivers
World Sportscar Championship drivers
24 Hours of Spa drivers
Mercedes-AMG Motorsport drivers